Department is an organizational term used by the U.S. Army, mostly prior to World War I, to describe named geographical districts created for control and administration of installations and units. In 1920, most of the named departments were redesignated as numbered Corps Areas. However, the Hawaiian, Panama Canal, and Philippine Departments retained their old names. In 1939, the Puerto Rican Department was created and in May 1941 the Panama Canal and Puerto Rican Departments were combined as the Caribbean Defense Command, although each was still referred to as a department.

1800s

War of 1812 
The United States Army was divided into nine military districts by the War Department General Order, of 19 March 1813. They were increased to ten on 2 July 1814 but reduced to nine by consolidation of the 4th and 10th Military Districts in January 1815. Military districts were abolished, 17 May 1815.

1815–21 
At the end of the War of 1812, Military districts were superseded by ten Military Departments, divided equally between Divisions of the North and South, 17 May 1815.
 Division of the North, 17 May 1815 – May 1821
 1st Military Department, 1815–17
 2nd Military Department, 1815–18
 3rd Military Department, 1815–17
 Consolidated 1st and 3rd Military Departments, 1817–19
 Consolidated 1st and 3rd Military Departments, 1818–21
 4th Military Department, 1815–19
 Consolidated 1st, 3rd, and 4th Military Departments, 1819–21
 5th Military Department, 1815–21.
 Division of the South, 17 May 1815 – May 1821
 6th Military Department, 1815–1821
 7th Military Department, 1815–1821
 8th Military Department, 1815–19, 1820–21
 9th Military Department, June 1819 – June 1821
 10th Military Department, 1815–1821

1821–1837 
Reorganization of the Army into Eastern and Western Departments, May 1821.
 Eastern Department, 1821–37
 Western Department, 1821–37
 Right Wing, Western Department, 1832–37
 Army of the Frontier, 1832
 1st Army Corps, North West Army, 1832
 Army of the Southwestern Frontier, 1834–37

1837–1844 
From 1837 to 1842, some of the Departments were subordinated to the Eastern and Western Divisions.
 Eastern Division, 1837–42
 7th Military Department, 1837–41
 Western Division, 1837–42
 1st Military Department, 1837–42
 2nd Military Department, 1837–42
 7th Military Department, 1841–42
 1st Military Department, 1843
 2nd Military Department, 1843–51
 3rd Military Department, 1842–48
 4th Military Department, 1842–53
 5th Military Department, 1842–52
 8th Military Department, 1842–46
 9th Military Department, 1842–45 (Florida)

1844–1848 
The Eastern and Western Divisions were not restored until 1853.
 Eastern Division, 1844–48
 5th Military Department, 1844–48
 8th Military Department, 1844–46
 Western Division, 1844–48
 2nd Military Department, 1844–48
 3rd Military Departments, 1844–48
 4th Military Department, 1842–53
 9th Military Department, 1845
 10th Military Department, 1846–1853 (California and Oregon to 1848)

1848–1853 
All departments were subordinated under one of three Divisions.
 Eastern Division, 1848–53
 1st Military Department, 1848–53; consolidated 1st and 3d Military Departments, 1849–50
 2nd Military Department, 1848–51; consolidated 1st and 2d Military Departments, 1848–49
 3rd Military Departments, 1848, 1850–53
 4th Military Departments, 1848–53; consolidated 3d and 4th Military Departments, 1848
 Western Division, 1848–53
 consolidated 5th and 6th Military Departments, 1848
 5th Military Department, 1848–52
 6th Military Department, 1848–53
 7th Military Department, 1848–53
 8th Military Department, 1848–49, 1851–53
 9th Military Department, 1849–53 (New Mexico)
 Pacific Division, 1848–53,(California and Oregon)
 10th Military Department, 1846–1853 (California and Oregon to 1848)
 11th Military Department, 1848–1853 (Oregon)

1853–1861 
After 31 October 1853 the division echelon was eliminated and the six western departments consolidated into four (Departments of Texas, New Mexico, the West, and the Pacific), whose department commanders employed their troops as they saw fit. The system returned to six departments in 1858 when the Department of Utah was created in January, and the Department of the Pacific split into the Departments of California and Oregon in September.
 Department of the East, 1853 – 17 August 1861
 Department of the West, 1853 – 3 July 1861
 Department of Texas, 1853 – 22 April 1861
 Department of the Pacific, 1853 – September 13, 1858; 15 January 1861 – 27 June 1865
 Department of New Mexico, 1853 – 27 June 1865
 Department of Utah, 30 June 1857 – 3 July 1861
 Department of the Platte, 4 April 1858 – 16 May 1859
 Department of California, 13 September 1858 – 15 January 1861
 Department of Oregon, 13 September 1858 – 15 January 1861

1861–1865 Civil War 
During the American Civil War, a department was a geographical command within the Union's military organization, usually reporting directly to the War Department.  Many of the Union's departments were named after rivers, such as the Department of the Potomac and the Department of the Tennessee.  The geographical boundaries of such departments changed frequently, as did their names.   As the armies became larger Departments began to be subordinated to Military Divisions, and the Departments were often sub divided into Districts and from 1862, Subdistricts.   Much information on Civil War departments can be found in Eicher & Eicher, Civil War High Commands.
 Union Army Divisions, Departments and Districts

1865–67 
 Military Division of the Atlantic, 1865–66
 Department of the East, 1865–73; independent 1866–68
 Middle Military Department, 1866
 Department of North Carolina, 1865–66; to Department of the Carolinas
 Department of South Carolina, 1865–66; to Department of the Carolinas
 Department of the Carolinas, May 1866; renamed Department of the South, June 1866; to Second Military District
 Department of Virginia, 1865–66; to First Military District
 Military Division of the Tennessee, 1865–67
 Department of Alabama, 1865–66
 Department of Georgia, 1865–66
 Department of the South, 1866; to Third Military District
 Department of Kentucky, 1865–66
 Department of Mississippi, 1865–66; to Fourth Military District
 Department of Tennessee, 1865–66
 Department of the Cumberland, 1866
 District of Tennessee, 1866
 Sub-district of Tennessee, 1866
 Military Division of the Missouri, 1865; to Military Division of the Missouri
 Department of Arkansas, 1865; to Military Division of the Gulf
 Department of the Missouri, 1865; to Military Division of the Mississippi
 Department of the Northwest, 1865; merged into Department of the Missouri
 Military Division of the Mississippi, 1865–66
 Department of the Ohio, 1865–66
 Department of Arkansas, 1865–66; to Military Division of the Missouri
 Department of the Missouri, 1865–66; to Military Division of the Missouri
 Department of the Platte, 1866; to Military Division of the Missouri
 Military Division of the Gulf, 1865–66
 Department of Arkansas, 1865; to Military Division of the Mississippi
 Department of Louisiana, 1865–66; to Fifth Military District
 Department of Texas, 1865–66; to Fifth Military District
 Department of Florida, 1865–66; to Third Military District
 Department of Mississippi, 1865; to Military Division of the Tennessee
 Military Division of the Pacific, 1865–68, Division of the Pacific 1869–91
 Department of the Columbia, 1865–1913
 Department of California, 1865–1913
 Military District of Alaska, 18 October 1867 – 18 March 1868
 Department of Alaska, 18 March 1868 – 1 July 1870; merged into Department of the Columbia
 Military Division of the Missouri, 1866–91
 Department of Arkansas, 1866–67; to Fourth Military District
 Department of Dakota, 1866–91
 Department of the Missouri, 1866–91
 Department of the Platte, 1866–91
 Department of Texas, 1871–80

Military Reconstruction from 22 March 1867 
 First Military District, 1867–70 (Virginia)
 Second Military District, 1867–68 (North Carolina and South Carolina)
 Third Military District, 1867–68 (Georgia, Alabama and Florida)
 Fourth Military District, 1867–70 (Arkansas and Mississippi)
 Fifth Military District, 1866–70 (Texas and Louisiana)
 Military District of Georgia, 1870–71

1868–1904 
 Division of the Atlantic, 1868–91
 Department of the East, 1868–73
 Department of the Lakes, 1868–73
 Department of Washington, 1868–69
 1st Military District, 1869–70 (Virginia)
 Department of Virginia, 1870
 Department of the South, 1876–83
 Department of the Gulf, 1877–78
 Department of the East, 1877–91
 Division of the South, 1869–76
 Department of the Cumberland, 1869–70
 Department of the Gulf, 1871–75
 Department of Louisiana, 1869–70
 Department of the South, 1869–76
 Department of Texas, 1870–71
 4th Military District, 1869–70 (Arkansas and Mississippi)
 District of Baton Rouge, 1876
 1st Subdistrict of Georgia, 1870–71
 Division of the Pacific, 1869–91
 Department of Alaska, 1869–70
 District of Arizona, 1869–70
 District of the Humboldt, 1869
 Sub-district of Southern Arizona, 1869–70
 Department of Arizona, 1870–91
 Department of California, 1870–91
 Department of the Columbia, 1870–91
 Department of the South, 1876–83
 Fort Johnson, NC, 1876–81
 Military Division of the Gulf, 1881
 Department of Arkansas, 1881
 Department of Texas, 1881
 Department of Texas, 1882–1904
 Department of the East, 1891–1904
 Department of the Platte, 1891–98
 Department of the Missouri, 1891–1904
 Department of Dakota, 1891–1904
 Department of Arizona, 1891–1893
 Department of California, 1891–1904
 Department of the Columbia, 1891–1904
 Department of Colorado, 1893–1904
 Department of Alaska, 1900–01

1898–99 Spanish–American War, Philippine Insurrection, Moro Rebellion 
 Department of the Lakes, 1898–1913
 Department of the Gulf, 1898–99
 Department of California, 1898
Military District of Hawaii, 22 Sep – 7 November 1898
 Department of the Pacific and 8th Army Corps, 1898 – 20 March 1900
 Division of the Philippines, 20 March 1900 – 1911
 Northern Luzon, 1900–02
 Department of Southern Luzon, 1900–01
 Department of Visayas, 1900–11
 Department of Mindanao and Jolo, 1900–14
 Department of North Philippines, 1901–02
 Department of South Philippines, 1901–02
 Department of Luzon, 1902–14

1900s

1904–1911 
The Army Departments were reorganized under new Divisions until 1907, when the Division echelon was disbanded.
 Atlantic Division, 1903–07
 Department of the East, 1903–13
 Department of the Gulf, 1904–13
 Northern Division, 1904–07
 Department of Dakota, 1904–11
 Department of the Lakes, 1904–11
 Department of the Missouri, 1904–07
 Southwestern Division, 1904–07
 Department of Colorado, 1904–11
 Department of Texas, 1904–13
 Pacific Division, 1904–07
 Department of California, 1904–13
District of Hawaii, 1910–1911
 Department of the Columbia, 1904–13

Western Division (United States Army) 1911–1913 
The Departments where again organized under new Divisions.
 Eastern Division, 1911–13
 Department of the East, 1911–13
 Department of the Gulf, 1911–13
 Central Division, 1911–13
 Department of the Lakes, 1911–13
 Department of the Missouri, 1911–13
 Department of Texas, 1911–13
 Western Division, 1911–13
 Department of California, 1911–13
 Department of the Columbia, 1911–13
 District of Hawaii, 1911–13
 Philippines Division, 1911–1913
 Department of Mindanao and Jolo, 1911–14
 Department of Luzon, 1911–14

"Stimson Plan" 1913 – 1 May 1917 
 Eastern Department, 1913–1920
 Southern Department, 1913–1920
 Central Department, 1913–1920
 Western Department, 1913–1920
 Hawaiian Department, 1913–1920
 Philippine Department, 1913–1942
 Department of Mindanao and Jolo, 1913–14
 Department of Luzon, 1913–14
 North Atlantic, South Atlantic, and Pacific Coast Artillery Districts

1 May 1917 – 1920 
 Northeastern Department
 Northeastern Coast Artillery District
 Eastern Department
 Eastern Coast Artillery District
 Southeastern Department
 Southeastern Coast Artillery District
 Southern Department
 Southern Coast Artillery District
 Central Department
 Western Department
 Western Coast Artillery District
 Hawaiian Department
 Philippine Department
 Panama Canal Department, 26 June 1917 – 1920
 Panama Coast Artillery District, 26 June 1917 – 1920

See also
 Departments of the Continental Army
 Corps area

References

  U.S. Army Order of Battle 1919–1941, Volume 1. The Arms: Major Commands and Infantry Organizations(chapter 2)
  National Archives, Guide to Federal Records; Records of United States Army Continental Commands, 1821–1920 (Record Group 393), 1817–1940 (bulk 1817–1920)

Departments and districts of the United States Army